The Thuringian Highland, Thuringian Highlands or Thuringian-Vogtlandian Slate Mountains ( or Thüringisches Schiefergebirge, literally "Thuringian Slate Hills") is a low range of mountains in the German state of Thuringia.

Geography 
The Thuringian Highland borders on the Thuringian Forest to the southwest. It is a plateau about 20 km wide that slopes southeast towards the Saale valley in the area of the Saale Dam and includes parts of the Thuringian Forest and Thuringian Highland and Upper Saale Nature Park.

The largest towns in the Thuringian Highland are Saalfeld and Bad Blankenburg which lie on its northern perimeter, Neuhaus am Rennweg in the highest region and Bad Lobenstein on the eastern edge (where it transitions into Franconian Forest).

The area includes a total of 4 smaller regions: 
 upper Saale valley
 Plothen Lake District
 High slate mountains
 Sormitz-Schwarza region

The slate mountains of the Vogtland and Thuringian Highland stretch from the Thuringian Forest to the Ore Mountains (Erzgebirge). They extend for about 75 km from east to west and 50 km from north to south. Typical features of the landscape are the dolerite peaks or Kuppen (like the Pöhlde or the Hübel) with their wooded crests. These are made from a volcanic rock, dolerite, which is harder than the surrounding rocks and so weathers more slowly, giving rise to the characteristic Kuppen.

Geology 

As its German name suggests, the Thuringian Highland is mainly made of slate rock. Although this region was formed in a similar way to the Harz, it lacks the sharp divisions caused by fault lines. Almost all the way round the region transitions gradually into the surrounding land. The rocks found here are from the Palaeozoic era, i.e. the  Ordovician, Silurian, Devonian and Lower Carboniferous periods. The most important ones are:

 Shale, 
 Alaunschiefer,
 Radiolarite, 
 Limestone, 
 Sandstone, 
 Greywacke, 
 Dolerite, 
 Spilite 
 and volcanic conglomerates.

Karst-forming, and hence cave-forming, limestone only occurs in a few, small, isolated areas. As a result the number of caves is very low.

Rivers and hydro-electric power 
In the Saale Valley there are two of the largest dams in Germany, which form the Hohenwarte and Bleiloch Reservoirs. In the Schwarza Valley there is the Goldisthal Pumped Storage Station, opened in 2003, which is one of the largest pumped-storage hydro-electric power stations in Europe.

Mountains and hills 
Around the steep-sided valleys of the Schwarza and Saale the height difference between hilltops and valley bottoms is often as much as 300 m or more, which is large for hills of this size. 
 Großer Farmdenkopf (869 m), Sonneberg district
 Kieferle (867 m), Sonneberg district 
 Bleßberg (865 m), Hildburghausen district
 Dürre Fichte (861 m), Sonneberg district
 Breitenberg (Thuringian Forest) (844 m), Sonneberg district
 Fellberg (842 m), Steinach, Sonneberg district
 Eselsberg (842 m), Hildburghausen district, Thuringian Forest/Thuringian Highland border
 Pechleite (839 m), Hildburghausen district
 Fehrenberg (835 m), Hildburghausen district, Thuringian Forest/Thuringian Highland border 
 Hoher Schuß (827 m), Saalfeld-Rudolstadt district
 Wurzelberg (820 m), Sonneberg district
 Jagdschirm (813 m), Saalfeld-Rudolstadt district
 Hintere Haube (811 m), Ilm district
 Langer Berg (809 m), Ilm district 
 Hettstädt (808 m), Saalfeld-Rudolstadt district
 Rauhhügel (802 m), Saalfeld-Rudolstadt district
 Roter Berg (799 m), Sonneberg district
 Wetzstein (791 m), Saalfeld-Rudolstadt district
 Meuselbacher Kuppe (786 m), Saalfeld-Rudolstadt district
 Fröbelturm (784 m), Saalfeld-Rudolstadt district
 Grendel (784 m), Hildburghausen district
 Spitzer Berg (781 m), Saalfeld-Rudolstadt district
 Simmersberg (781 m), Landkr. Hildburghausen, Thuringian Forest/Thuringian Highland border
 Himmelsleiter (Berg) (774 m), Saalfeld-Rudolstadt district
 Töpfersbühl (762 m), Saalfeld-Rudolstadt district
 Sieglitzberg (733 m), Saale-Orla district
 Kirchberg (Thuringia) (725,3 m), Saalfeld-Rudolstadt district
 Rosenberg (Thuringian Highland) (716 m), Saalfeld-Rudolstadt district
 Großer Mühlberg (714 m), Sonneberg district
 Quittelsberg (709 m), Saalfeld-Rudolstadt district
 Bocksberg (696 m), Sonneberg district 
 Auf der Heide (668 m), Saalfeld-Rudolstadt district
 Beerberg (667 m), Saalfeld-Rudolstadt district
 Barigauer Höhe (665 m), Saalfeld-Rudolstadt district
 Zipptanskuppe (657 m), Saalfeld-Rudolstadt district
 Rosenbühl (653 m), Saale-Orla district 
 Keilsburg (648 m), Saalfeld-Rudolstadt district
 Eisenberg (636 m), Saalfeld-Rudolstadt district
 Talberg (602 m), Saalfeld-Rudolstadt district
 Batzenberg (588 m), Saalfeld-Rudolstadt district
 Schwarzer Berg (Thuringia) (582 m), Saalfeld-Rudolstadt district
 Elmischer Berg (529 m), Saalfeld-Rudolstadt district
 Geiersberg (520 m), Saalfeld-Rudolstadt district
 Rabenhügel (506 m), Saalfeld-Rudolstadt district
 Roderberg (502 m), Saalfeld-Rudolstadt district
 Sommerberg (493 m), Saalfeld-Rudolstadt district
 Ziegenberg (460 m), Saalfeld-Rudolstadt district

See also 
 Thuringian Forest

References

Literature 
 Ernst Kaiser: Thüringerwald und Schiefergebirge, 2nd improved and expanded edn., Gotha, 1955.
 Adolf Hanle (ed.): Thüringerwald und Schiefergebirge, Mannheim etc. 1992.

External links 
 Thuringian Highland Nature Park

Central Uplands
Thuringian Forest
Forests and woodlands of Thuringia
Mountain ranges of Thuringia
Highlands